Greensville County Training School, also known as the Greensville County Learning Center, is a historic Rosenwald school building located at Emporia, Virginia. It was built in 1929, and is a single story, "U"-shaped brick building.  It consists of a front hyphen that connects two wings containing classrooms, while an auditorium, office space, and a library form the interior central space.  A classroom addition was constructed in 1934.  It was constructed for the education of African-American students, and closed in the 1960s following desegregation of the public schools.

It was listed on the National Register of Historic Places in 2006.

Possible future

After desegregation and the building of the new Greensville County Elementary School in the County, the School Board used the Rosenwald building for storage and the new wing for offices.  The Rosenwald portion of the complex fell into disrepair and has since been deeded to a community based preservation group.  The condition of the building was so dire that the group undertook selective demolition to save as much of the building as possible.

References

Rosenwald schools in Virginia
School buildings on the National Register of Historic Places in Virginia
School buildings completed in 1929
Buildings and structures in Emporia, Virginia
National Register of Historic Places in Emporia, Virginia
1929 establishments in Virginia